Michelangelo or Michelangiolo Cerruti (1663 – 24 December 1749) was an Italian painter of the Baroque period, active mainly in Rome.

At a young age, he was a pupil of Giuseppe Passeri in Rome and afterwards lived for a decade in northern Italy, especially in Turin. After returning to Rome he worked with Andrea Pozzo, and became an expert fresco artist. His painterly decorations cover vaults in many Roman churches, including Santa Anastasia and San Macuto. His name is sometimes spelled Cerrutti.

References

1663 births
1749 deaths
Painters from Rome
17th-century Italian painters
Italian male painters
18th-century Italian painters
Italian Baroque painters
18th-century Italian male artists